Elections were held in the Australian state of Victoria on Saturday 21 June 1958 to elect 17 of the 34 members of the state's Legislative Council for six year terms. MLCs were elected in single-member provinces using preferential voting. This was the last time Legislative Council elections were held separately to those of the Legislative Assembly.

Results

Legislative Council

|}

Retiring Members

Democratic Labor
Paul Jones MLC (Doutta Galla) — elected as Labor

Candidates
Sitting members are shown in bold text. Successful candidates are highlighted in the relevant colour. Where there is possible confusion, an asterisk (*) is also used.

Results by province

Ballarat

Bendigo

Doutta Galla 

 Two party preferred vote was estimated.

East Yarra

Gippsland 

 Two party preferred vote was estimated.

Higinbotham 

 Two party preferred vote was estimated.

Melbourne 

Maurie Sheehy was elected in 1952 as a member of Labor, then defected to the DLP in 1955.

Melbourne North 

 Two party preferred vote was estimated.
 Jack Little was elected in 1952 as a member of Labor, then defected to the DLP in 1955.

Melbourne West 

 Bert Bailey was elected in 1952 as a member of Labor, then defected to the DLP in 1955.

Monash 

 Thomas Brennan was elected in 1952 as a member of Labor, then defected to the DLP in 1955.

Northern

North-Eastern

North-Western

Southern

South-Eastern 

 Two party preferred vote was estimated.

South-Western

Western

See also
1958 Victorian state election

References

1958 elections in Australia
Elections in Victoria (Australia)
Results of Victorian state elections
1950s in Victoria (Australia)
June 1958 events in Australia
Victorian Legislative Council